Silvia Velarde Pereyra (born 25 September 1970), better known by her stage name, Sibah, is a Bolivian blues and rock and roll singer-songwriter.

Early life
Sibah, whose artistic career began in 1994, is a soloist and also sings with the a cappella quintet Vozabierta. She studied business administration, has a diploma in political philosophy, and has worked in development cooperation.

Career
Sibah has three CDs and one EP of her own, and two with Vozabierta. The quintet was created in 2006, and its other members are Mercedes Campos Villanueva, María Teresa Dal Pero, Julia Peredo Guzmán, and Mariana Requena Oroza.

Sibah is also part of the Bolivian women's group "Intervención poética a la música" (Poetic Intervention to Music), which seeks to promote dialogue between poetry and music, and the "Nosotras Somos" (We Are) movement, which proposes an exchange and reappropriation of women's compositions. In 2016, she participated in a recital sponsored by UN Women for the HeForShe campaign.

She leads workshops on vocal technique, and is Bolivia's representative for the method developed in Mexico by voice researcher John Loza M., who was her voice teacher.

Sibah has presented concerts around her country and also abroad.

Work
Sibah began her career interpreting diverse genres, ranging from rock and blues to cueca. Her solo albums are:

 Con un poquito, 2005
 In.Tenso, 2013
 DesIgual, 2015
 Ami nome, 2019

Awards and distinctions
 Third prize for the AIDS Prevention Campaign, 1998
 Representative of Bolivia chosen by the Mercosur Cultural Network, with the song "Al Amanecer", 2010
 Eduardo Abaroa Plurinational Award for Best Composition in Rock Music, 2012

References

External links
 

1970 births
Blues singer-songwriters
21st-century Bolivian women singers
Bolivian singer-songwriters
Women rock singers
Living people
People from La Paz